KKWY (88.7 FM) was a radio station licensed to cover Estes Park, Colorado, United States. The station was owned by Cedar Cove Broadcasting, Inc.

Cedar Cove Broadcasting surrendered the station's license to the Federal Communications Commission (FCC) on April 7, 2016; the FCC cancelled KKWY's license on April 12, 2016.

References

External links
 

KWY
Radio stations established in 2012
2012 establishments in Wyoming
Defunct radio stations in the United States
Radio stations disestablished in 2016
2016 disestablishments in Colorado